Amara ovata is a species of ground beetle native to Europe.

References

ovata
Beetles described in 1792
Beetles of Europe